The 28th Annual American Music Awards were held on January 8, 2001, at the Shrine Auditorium, in Los Angeles, California. The awards recognized the most popular artists and albums from the year 2000. The show was hosted by Britney Spears and LL Cool J.

Performances

Bow Wow

Winners and nominees

References
 http://www.rockonthenet.com/archive/2001/amas.htm
 http://www.digitalhit.com/ama/28.shtml

2001
2001 music awards